In 2011 NASA opened applications for Astronaut Group 21. The team was announced in June 2013 after a year and a half long search. With four men and four women, the class of 2013 had the highest percentage of female finalists. According to NASA astronaut Kathleen Rubins, "it's… a reflection of how many really talented women are in science and engineering these days." NASA received a total of over 6,300 applications, which made it the second highest number received at the time (the class of 2017 surpassed both records with a total of more than 18,300).

Traditionally, the upcoming class is given a nickname by the previous class. Following this custom, the class of 2009 (also known as "The Chumps") christened the 2013 class the "Eight Balls" in reference to there being eight of them. Bob Behnken, then Chief of the Astronaut Office, stated in an interview that the name further represents that, "The eight ball [in billiards or pool] is played last and the hope from the preceding class is that the [2013 astronaut candidates] will be assigned after all of them [fly]." The team consists of eight people, Jessica Meir, Ph.D., Major Nicole Mann, Lt. Commander Josh Cassada, Ph.D., Lt. Colonel Tyler Hague, Christina Koch, Major Andrew Morgan, M.D., Lt. Commander Victor Glover, and Lt. Colonel Anne McClain.

Of the five members of the group who have flown in space as of April 2020, all five place on the list of then longest spaceflights for NASA astronauts, with Koch holding the record for the longest single spaceflight for a woman. Meir and Koch were also the first women to participate in an all-female spacewalk.

History
On April 9, 1959 the National Aeronautics and Space Administration (NASA) announced the finalists for Astronaut Group 1. This group of seven astronauts, also sometimes known as the "Original Seven" or the "Mercury Seven" were a part of the first human spaceflight program, called Project Mercury. Since the original group, the total number of astronaut groups has grown to 22 as of 2017. The Group 21 class joined 47 other active NASA astronauts.

Selection and training 

A requirement for selection to the astronaut program is to have United States citizenship and a degree in science, engineering or math.  In addition, three years of professional experience for non-pilots and at least 1000 hours of jet flight time for pilots is required. Community service is an advantage. Lastly, applicants must be able to pass the NASA flight physical. The selection process takes approximately 18 months.

Astronaut candidates go through two years of training. They study engineering, earth and space science, meteorology and space station systems.  They also undergo strenuous survival training including scuba certification and swim test qualifications.  After this stage, the astronauts who are selected to continue work with senior astronauts who mentor them in furthering their training.  In the final training period, the astronauts focus on the specific requirements for their mission.

Group members

 Josh A. Cassada, born 18 July 1973, San Diego, California
 Pilot – SpaceX Crew-5 (Expedition 68) – 5 October 2022.
 Victor J. Glover, born 30 April 1976, Pomona, California
 Pilot – SpaceX Crew-1 (Expedition 64/65) – 16 November 2020
 Tyler N. "Nick" Hague, born 24 September 1975, Belleville, Kansas
 Flight Engineer – Soyuz MS-10 (Expedition 57/58) – 11 October 2018 (Aborted Sub-orbital)
 Flight Engineer – Soyuz MS-12 (Expedition 59/60) – 14 March 2019
 Christina Hammock Koch, born 29 January 1979, Grand Rapids, Michigan
 Flight Engineer – Soyuz MS-12 (Expedition 59/60/61) – 14 March 2019
 Nicole Aunapu Mann, born 27 June 1977, Petaluma, California
 Commander – SpaceX Crew-5 (Expedition 68) – 5 October 2022.
 Anne C. McClain, born 7 June 1979, Spokane, Washington
 Flight Engineer – Soyuz MS-11 (Expedition 58/59) – 3 December 2018
 Jessica U. Meir, Ph. D, born 1 July 1977, Caribou, Maine
 Flight Engineer – Soyuz MS-15 (Expedition 61/62) - 25 September 2019
 Andrew R. Morgan, MD, born 5 February 1976, Morgantown, West Virginia
 Flight Engineer – Soyuz MS-13 (Expedition 60/61/62) - 20 July 2019

Mission 
The 2013 class was originally thought to be the "first who will be trained for exploration beyond Earth orbit since the Apollo years." Their first goal was to have been to visit a near-earth asteroid in 2020, as preparation for an eventual mission to Mars. However, current NASA goals do not include an asteroid mission.

All eight members of the group have completed their training and have flown or are currently flying. Five were assigned to Soyuz expeditions to the International Space Station (ISS), with Hague as the first of the class to be assigned to fly, aboard Expedition 57/58 in November 2018, his flight being aborted during launch. McClain was on 58/59, Hammock Koch and Hague (on his reflight) on 59/60, Morgan on 60/61 and Meir on 61/62. Three other members were assigned to the Commercial Crew cadre for flights to the ISS: Mann was assigned to Boe-CFT and Cassada on CTS-1, both aboard Boeing's Starliner, and Glover was assigned to SpaceX's Dragon 2. Glover flew on SpaceX Crew-1, and Mann and Cassada were subsequently reassigned to Crew Dragon due to delays to Boeing Starliner entering service. Both flew on SpaceX Crew-5.

See also
 NASA Astronaut Group 22

References

External links
 2013 astronaut candidate class
 Official announcement from NASA
  
 NASA astronaut selection website
 Photostream of Group 21

Lists of astronauts
NASA Astronaut Corps